Several Canadian naval units have been named HMCS Calgary.

  (I), a  that served in the Royal Canadian Navy during the Battle of the Atlantic.
  (II), a  commissioned into the Canadian Forces on 12 May 1995.

Battle honours
 Atlantic, 1942–45
 Biscay, 1943
 Normandy, 1944
 English Channel, 1944–45
 North Sea, 1945
 Arabian Sea

References

 Directorate of History and Heritage - HMCS Calgary 
 South-West Asia Theatre Honours

Royal Canadian Navy ship names